Members of the Legislative Assembly of Samoa were elected on 4 March 2016. The 50 members consisted of 35 representatives of the Human Rights Protection Party, two from the Tautua Samoa Party and 13 independents. When Parliament convened, 47 members joined the Human Rights Protection Party faction and three sat as independents.

Members

Changes
 Pa’u Sefo Pa’u died on 19 January 2019. The subsequent by-election was won by Namulau'ulu Sami Leota.

References

External links
 Parliament of Samoa

 2016